

u

U-Cort
U-Gencin
ubenimex (INN)
ubidecarenone (INN)
ubisindine (INN)
ublituximab (INN)
Ucephan
udenafil (INN, USAN)
ufenamate (INN)
ufiprazole (INN)
ularitide (INN)
Ulcerease
uldazepam (INN)
ulimorelin (USAN, INN)
ulipristal (USAN)
Ulo. Redirects to Clofedanol.
ulobetasol (INN)
Uloric
Ultane
Ultiva
Ultra-Technekow Fm
Ultracef
Ultracet
Ultragris
Ultralente
Ultram
Ultramop
Ultraquin
UltraseUltratag
Ultravate
Ultravist
umeclidinium bromide (USAN)
umespirone (INN)
umifenovir (INN)
umirolimus (INN)
Unasyn
Unguentine
Uni-Decon
Uni-Dur
Uni-Fed
Uni-Pro
Uni-tussin
Unidet
Unipen
Uniphyl
Unipres
Uniretic
Unisom
Unitensen
Unithroid
Univasc
Univol
unoprostone (INN)
upamostat (INN)
upenazime (INN)
Urabeth
Uracil Mustard Capsules (Roberts)
uramustine (INN)
urapidil (INN)
Urasal
Ureaphil
Urecholine
uredepa (INN)
uredofos (INN)
urefibrate (INN)
urelumab (USAN)
Uremol
Urese
urethane (INN)
Urex
Uri-Tet
uridine triacetate (INN)
Urisec
Urised
Urispas
Uristat
Urobak
Urodine
urofollitropin (INN)
urokinase alfa (INN)
urokinase (INN)
Urologic
Uromitexan
Uroplus
Urovist
Uroxatral (Sanofi-Aventis) redirects to alfuzosin''Ursoursodeoxycholic acid (INN)ursulcholic acid (INN)urtoxazumab (INN)usistapide (USAN, INN)ustekinumab (USAN, INN)utibapril (INN)utibaprilat (INN)Uticillin VKUticortUtimoxUtradolUvadexUvadex''' (Therakos)